Nove Zaporizhzhia is a Ukrainian place name which can refer to two villages in Zaporizhzhia Oblast:
 Nove Zaporizhzhia, Huliaipole Raion, village
 Nove Zaporizhzhia, Zaporizhzhia Raion, village